The 1925 European Amateur Boxing Championships were held in Stockholm, Sweden, from 11 to 15 May. It was the first edition of the competition, organised by the European governing body for amateur boxing, EABA. There were 46 fighters from 12 countries participating.

Medal winners

Medal table

References

External links

European Championships
Results
EABA Boxing

European Amateur Boxing Championships
Boxing
European Amateur Boxing Championships
International boxing competitions hosted by Sweden
European Amateur Boxing Championships
International sports competitions in Stockholm
1920s in Stockholm